Brando is a French commune in the Haute-Corse department, island of Corsica.

Population

See also
Torra d'Erbalunga
Torra di Sacru

See also
Communes of the Haute-Corse department

References

Communes of Haute-Corse
Haute-Corse communes articles needing translation from French Wikipedia